Daniel Florence O'Leary (14 February 1801 – 24 February 1854) was a military general and aide-de-camp under Simón Bolívar.

Life
O'Leary was born in Cork, Ireland; his father was Jeremiah O'Leary, a butter merchant. In 1817, Daniel O'Leary emigrated to South America.

Unlike many of the Irish who fought for Simon Bolívar in his many campaigns to win South American independence, O'Leary had not served in the Napoleonic Wars.

In 1827 he married Soledad Soublette, the younger sister of General Carlos Soublette, with whom he had nine children.

After Bolívar's death in 1830, O'Leary disobeyed orders to burn the general's personal documents. He spent much of the rest of his life organizing them, along with writing his own very extensive memoirs (spanning thirty-four volumes) of his time fighting in the revolutionary wars with Bolívar. He died in Bogotá, Colombia.  He is buried in the National Pantheon of Venezuela.

A bust and plaque honouring O'Leary were presented by the Venezuelan Government to the people of Cork and unveiled on 12 May 2010 by the Venezuelan Ambassador to Ireland, Samuel Moncada.

See also

Irish military diaspora

References

External links
Short biography on O'Leary from the Society for Irish Latin American Studies
Biography from Journal 2001 of the historical society Ballingeary Cumann Staire
Moisés Enrique Rodríguez "Under Three Flags The Diplomatic Career of Daniel Florence O'Leary", in Irish Migration Studies in Latin America 7:1 (March 2009), pp. 85–92

1800s births
1854 deaths
Irish generals
People of the Venezuelan War of Independence
Irish emigrants to Venezuela
19th-century Venezuelan writers
People from County Cork
Ambassadors of the United Kingdom to Colombia
Burials at the National Pantheon of Venezuela